Weapons of Mass Distortion: The Coming Meltdown of the Liberal Media is a book by conservative activist L. Brent Bozell III, criticizing and documenting what Bozell described as the American news media's "liberal media bias."

Bozell argues that the "Liberal Media" will soon collapse on itself, due to their own refusal to admit their perceived faults and bias. As the alleged cycle continues, the possibility for them to recover from previous grievances becomes less likely.

The book may have been ghostwritten by Tim Graham.

See also
 Media Research Center

References

External links 
Reviews
 
 "Partisans of Neutrality: A review of Weapons of Mass Distortion and The Republican Noise Machine", by Richard Reeb, October 19, 2004, Claremont Institute.
 "The Truth Squad", book review by Michael Potemra, July 19, 2004. From the July 26, 2004, issue of National Review.
Primary sources
 "Weapons of Mass Distortion: The coming meltdown of the liberal media.", by L. Brent Bozell III; book foreword, published by National Review, July 8, 2004.
 "Weapons of Mass Distortion: A View of the Liberal Media", interview of Bozell by Lee Webb, July 16, 2004, Christian Broadcasting Network.
Other
 

2004 non-fiction books
Books about media bias